Louisiana Highway 308 (LA 308)  is a state highway in Louisiana that serves Ascension, Assumption, and Lafourche Parishes.  It spans , following the east bank of Bayou Lafourche from Donaldsonville to Golden Meadow.  It parallels LA 1 during its entire route, as LA 1 follows the west bank of the bayou.

Route description
LA 308 is the eastbank counterpart to LA 1, as it follows the east side of Bayou Lafourche.  As the eastbank of Bayou Lafourche is generally less populated than the westbank, LA 308 serves as a slightly quicker route towards south central Louisiana and lower Bayou Lafourche than LA 1.  Throughout its route, there are bridges that cross Bayou Lafourche to connect LA 308 to LA 1 and local communities.  LA 308 is known as Bayou Road in Thibodaux and East Main Street south of Larose.

The route begins north of Golden Meadow at the Golden Meadow Bridge crossing over Bayou Lafourche from LA 1 and runs parallel with Bayou Lafourche and LA 1 heading north, passing through Galliano and Cut Off before entering Larose. The highway loops around Larose and crosses over LA 657 before running parallel with LA 1 and Bayou Lafourche again. The highway intersects LA 3220 that crosses over Bayou Lafourche before entering Lockport. As it enters town, it intersects with LA 655 before running parallel with LA 1 and Bayou Lafourche. It intersects LA 654 before passing through Mathews, The highway then interchanges with US 90. However, LA 308 has no access to the westbound lanes on US 90. It only has access to the eastbound lanes and the westbound lanes on US 90 have access to LA 308, resulting in an incomplete interchange for the highway. The highway then heads west along with Bayou Lafourche and LA 1, passing through St. Charles and enters Thibodaux. It also intersects with LA 3266, LA 3185, and LA 304 heading towards Labadieville. It intersects LA 1014 and LA 1011 as it passes through Supreme. Heading north, it intersects LA 1010 and then passes through Napoleonville. It then curves along Bayou Lafourche passing through Plattenville and intersecting with LA 70 Spur. LA 308 then heads through Paincourtville, intersecting LA 403 and LA 70 before heading north again. The route then passes through Belle Rose and intersects LA 998 before continuing north towards Donaldsonville. It intersects LA 943 before entering Donaldsonville and intersects LA 945 and its spur route before reaching its northern terminus at LA 3089.

Major intersections

Louisiana Highway 308 Spur

LA 308 Spur provided a connection between LA 3235 and LA 1 on the west bank of Bayou Lafourche with LA 308 on the east bank in Galliano.  The route is now LA 3162.

References

External links

La DOTD State, District, and Parish Maps
District 02
District 61
Lafourche Parish (Southeast Section)
Lafourche Parish (Northeast Section)
Lafourche Parish (Northwest Section)
Assumption Parish
Ascension Parish

0308
Transportation in Ascension Parish, Louisiana
Transportation in Assumption Parish, Louisiana
Transportation in Lafourche Parish, Louisiana